Oliwia Bartosiewicz (born November 29, 2001), known professionally as Oliwka Brazil, is a Polish rapper and singer.

In 2021, she signed a contract with Warner Music Group.

Oliwka Brazil is listed alongside Young Leosia, among others, as a woman who is changing Polish hip-hop. In the lyrics of her songs, described as "vulgar," she speaks openly about sex, emphasizing that the character she creates has the urge for it and practices it on her own terms. In this way she breaks out of the existing pattern in Polish rap, in which women are often treated as trophies or humiliated "sluts". It is also emphasized that she writes lyrics, which so far in Polish rap have been written by men.

Controversy

Vulgarity and cursing 
Some media outlets have criticized Brazil because of the swearing in her songs and her vulgar image. "The underage youths shouting phrases about choking, spanking, spitting on a penis and swallowing semen looked cursory, and probably not all of them were aware of the words rapped from the stage in their direction." writes Mateusz Groen of the trojmiasto.pl portal about teenagers on Brazil's concerts. She is also often compared to "Polish Cardi B or Nicki Minaj".

Young Multi 
When Brazil's first single, "Big Mommy," came out, Polish Twitch streamer and rapper  spoke positively about her work. However, when he criticized subsequent singles, Oliwka Brazil wrote on her stories on Instagram that Young Multi's work is "shit that never resembled music," and that he is a "boy that has unfulfilled dreams of being a rapper, and just sits in front of the computer and bitches something about my music." Multi on his evening livestream was quick to comment on the situation, "Oliwka Brazil, you fucking hypocrite, well, it so happens that when your first song came out and I recommended you, wasn't it you who inserted my statement on your Instastories? Is this in some other universe?" He later talked about how he earned his success on his own and had no "friend Smolasty" who immediately put him on a million-subscribed YouTube channel.

Bodyshaming 
Brazil is also accused of bodyshaming and slutshaming skinny girls. In her song "Big Mommy," she raps that "escorts are skinny sluts and their nipples are like salami" and "you have XS bra, bitch, keep quiet."

Discography 
Singles

 Big Mommy (2020), POL: platinum
 Kokieterka (2021),  POL: gold
 Karaluchy (2022)
 Mamacita (2022)
 Chcę Być Jak Oliwka Brazil (2022)
 S.E.K.S. (2022)

Featurings

 Smolasty – Playboy (2020)
 Smolasty – Oh Daddy (2020), POL: platinum
 Young Leosia – Stonerki (2021), POL: platinum
 Smolasty – Toxic Baby (2022)
 Kizo – To Jak (2022)

Tours 

 Big Mommy Tour (2022)

References 

Living people
2001 births
Polish rappers
Polish singers